Robert Winder, formerly literary editor of The Independent for five years and Deputy Editor of Granta magazine during the late 1990s, is the author of Hell for Leather, a book about modern cricket, a book about British immigration, and also two novels ("Biographical Notes" 73) as well as many articles and book reviews in British periodicals.  Winder is a team member of the Gaieties Cricket Club, whose chairman was Harold Pinter.

Publications
Fiction
No Admission.  Penguin Crime Fiction ser. Penguin Group (USA), 1990.  (Paperback rpt.)   (10)  (13).
The Marriage of Time and Convenience.  Fontana Press, 1988.  (10).   (13).
The Final Act of Mr. Shakespeare.  Little, Brown, 2010.  .

Non-fiction
Bloody Foreigners: The Story of Immigration to Britain.  Little, Brown, 2004.  Abacus, 2005.   (10).   (13).
Hell for Leather: A Modern Cricket Journey.  Weidenfeld & Nicolson, 1996.  (10).   (13).
The Little Wonder: The Remarkable History of Wisden. Wisden, 2013.  (10).  (13)
The Last Wolf: The Hidden Springs Of Englishness. Little, Brown, 2017. 

Poetry
"Two O'clock, Putney Heath in August" – Poem © Robert Winder.  In "Literature of the Gaieties", haroldpinter.org.

Selected book reviews
"A Dying Game".  New Statesman, 19 June 2000.  ("Why would a cricketer commit suicide? Robert Winder reads the lives of three great former players and is bewildered by their self-absorption and petty obsessions.")

Selected editorials for Granta
Granta 58: Ambition.  (Contents from the archive; Winder's "Editorial" is not available online.)

Notes

References
"Biographical Notes".  69–73 in Harold Pinter: A Celebration.  Introd. Richard Eyre.  London: Faber and Faber, 2000.   (10).   (13).

External links
"Robert Winder" – Meet the Author feature: Robert Winder on Bloody Foreigners (2004).  (Audio file.)

Living people
20th-century British novelists
21st-century British novelists
British non-fiction writers
British male journalists
British magazine editors
British newspaper editors
British literary editors
Cricket historians and writers
British male novelists
20th-century British male writers
21st-century British male writers
Year of birth missing (living people)